Tigress is the name of three different comic book supervillains, all of whom have appeared in various series published by DC Comics.

An original incarnation of Tigress called Tabitha Galavan appeared in the live-action series Gotham, portrayed by Jessica Lucas. Additionally, the Paula Brooks incarnation of Tigress appeared in the live-action DC Universe / The CW series Stargirl, portrayed by Joy Osmanski.

Publication history
The first Golden Age Tigress was a thief/spy and foe of Zatara in the late 1930s. She debuted in Action Comics #1 (June 1938), and was created by Fred Guardineer. She wore tiger-striped sweaters and ran gangs of thieves and murderers. She apparently had no powers.

The second Tigress is Paula Brooks, who was a member of the Young All-Stars, who later became a villainess named the Huntress.

The third Tigress is Artemis Crock, the daughter of the second Tigress, and is a member of the Injustice Society. She debuted in Infinity Inc. #34 and was created by Roy Thomas and Todd McFarlane.

Fictional character biography

Zatara foe

The original Tigress appeared as Zatara's primary foe throughout twelve issues of Action Comics, including issues #1, 3, 6, 7, 9, 10, 22, 23, 25, 30, 35 and 42. In her initial appearance, she battles Zatara and his assistant Tong while attempting to rob a freight train. She escapes and later resurfaces in stories using various methods in attempts to kill wealthy men, including using an attacking airplane, poisoning their drinks and infecting them with a disease from a rare South American insect. She also uses her influence as a mob boss to pressure other criminals into assisting her in crime sprees, which usually involve bank robberies and thefts of other valuables.

The Artemis entry in Who's Who Update '87 #1 states that the Golden Age Tigress is the mother of Paula Brooks (the second Tigress and original Huntress) and the grandmother of Artemis Crock (the third Tigress). However, Who's Who Update '87 #5 included a retraction of that information and stated that neither Paula Brooks nor Artemis Crock is related to her.

Paula Brooks

The second Tigress is Paula Brooks. She was a member of the Young All-Stars and later became the villainous Huntress. She later married the Sportsmaster, and had a daughter, Artemis Crock, who becomes the third Tigress.

Artemis Crock

Artemis Crock is the daughter of the Golden Age villains Paula Brooks and Crusher Crock. She had taken up a career in crime, modeled after that of her parents, but only after some years did she take on the mantle of Tigress.

Other versions

Tigress (Earth-S)
An unknown woman nicknamed Tigress appears in Spy Smasher #2 (December 1941). This version is an enemy of Spy Smasher.

Tigress (Quality Universe)
An unknown woman dubbed The Tigress or Tiger Lady appears in Blackhawk #11 (June 1946). She is the leader of a gang of international criminal fugitives, who had fled the civilized world and holed up in a well-hidden fortress, in a jungle, in a mountainous, tropical part of the world. She organized this rabble into a tiger-masked team of deadly spearmen, mainly in order to keep the local natives at bay. A chance encounter with the Blackhawk Squadron, and a few bad decisions on her part, led to the Tigress' being killed by arrow-shooting natives, and her thugs being killed by the pistol-packing Blackhawks.

In other media

 A variation of Tigress appears in the Batman Beyond episode "Splicers", voiced by Cree Summer. This version is a human spliced with tiger DNA who was created by genetics expert Dr. Abel Cuvier.
 The Artemis Crock incarnation of Tigress appears in Young Justice, voiced by Stephanie Lemelin. This version initially uses the Tigress identity to work undercover as a supervillain and infiltrate the Light before permanently assuming the identity after her boyfriend Kid Flash dies saving Earth from an alien invasion.
 A variation of Tigress appears in Gotham, portrayed by Jessica Lucas. This version is Tabitha Galavan, sister and lead enforcer of Theo Galavan (portrayed by actor James Frain), both members of the Dumas family and step-relatives of Silver St. Cloud.
 The Paula Brooks incarnation of Tigress appears in Stargirl, portrayed by Joy Osmanski. This version is a member of the Injustice Society of America.

References

External links
 Comic Book Database: Tigress I
 The Unofficial Tigress I Biography

Comics characters introduced in 1938
Comics characters introduced in 1947
Comics characters introduced in 1987
Fictional archers
DC Comics martial artists
DC Comics female supervillains
DC Comics female superheroes
DC Comics LGBT supervillains
DC Comics television characters
Fictional assassins in comics
Fictional female assassins
Fictional gangsters
Fictional amputees
Fictional LGBT characters in television
Characters created by Roy Thomas
Characters created by Todd McFarlane
Fictional murdered people
Vigilante characters in comics